Decrement may refer to:
Decrement table
Logarithmic decrement
Increment and decrement operators

See also
Increment (disambiguation)